Debi Prasanna Pattanayak (born 14 March 1931) is an Indian professor, linguist, social scientist and author. He was the founder-director of the Central Institute of Indian Languages, Mysore and former chairman of Institute of Odia Studies and Research, Bhubaneswar. Pattanayak was awarded Padma Shri in 1987. for his contribution to formalize, and adding Bodo language in the 8th schedule of the Constitution of India. He also take a major role led Odia language to acquire the status of a "classical language".

Selected works 
 Multilingualism in India
 Intensive Hindi course: drills
 Language and Social Issues: Princess Leelavathi Memorial Lectures
 Papers in Indian Sociolinguistics
 An Introduction to Tamil Script, Reading & Writing
 Multilingualism and mother-tongue education
 Language Policy and Programmes
 Advanced Tamil Reader, Part 1
 An Outline of Kumauni Grammar
 Language and Cultural Diversity: The Writings of Debi Prasanna Pattanayak, Volume 2
 Language, Education, and Culture
 A Controlled Historical Reconstruction of Oriya, Assamese, Bengali, and Hindi
 Conversational Oriya
 Orissa, Oriya and the Multilingual Context
 Multilingualism and Multiculturalism: Britain and India
 An Introduction Ti Tamil Script, Reading & Writing
 An Introduction to Tamil Script, Reading & Writing
 Rabīndra smaraṇīkā
 Kabilipi

Honors 
 Kalinga Sahitya Samman 2014
 Tigiria Samman 2011
 Padma Shri, 1987
 PhD (Ravenshaw University)

References

External links

1931 births
Cornell University alumni
Scientists from Bhubaneswar
20th-century Indian linguists
Scholars from Odisha
Recipients of the Padma Shri in literature & education
Living people
Odia language